Kelly Anne Rickon (born October 27, 1959) is an American former competitive rower and Olympic silver medalist.

Olympian
Rickon qualified for the 1980 U.S. Olympic team but was unable to compete due to the 1980 Summer Olympics boycott. She did however receive one of 461 Congressional Gold Medals created especially for the spurned athletes. She was a member of the American women's quadruple sculls team that won the silver medal at the 1984 Summer Olympics in Los Angeles, California.

References

External links
 
 
 

1959 births
Living people
American female rowers
Rowers at the 1984 Summer Olympics
Olympic silver medalists for the United States in rowing
Medalists at the 1984 Summer Olympics
Congressional Gold Medal recipients
21st-century American women